Brachyopa insensilis is a Palearctic species of hoverflies.

Description
External images
For terms see Morphology of Diptera
The wing length is 6·5-7·25 mm. 
Apical antennomere small and without a sensory pit. Arista almost bare. Face less produced than in Brachyopa bicolor. Scutellum with microtrichia only on anterior margin. The larva is illustrated by Rotheray (1993).

Distribution
Brachyopa insensilis is a Palearctic species with a wide distribution in Europe and east to Tadjikistan, Siberia, Russian Far East and Kamchatka.

The habitat is Abies, Quercus and Fagus forest with senile trees, but also occurs on old trees in suburban parks.

Behaviour
Brachyopa insensilis is arboreal descending  to visit sap runs and flowers (white umbellifers, Photinia, Prunus padus, Sorbus aria. The flight period is from the beginning of May to the end of June. Brachyopa insensilis has a characteristic, rapid, zigzag flight and rarely descends lower than 3 metres from the ground. It may occur in small swarms around sap runs. Larvae feed in sap runs and rot holes.

References

External links
 Biolib

Diptera of Europe
Taxa named by James Edward Collin
Eristalinae
Insects described in 1939
Palearctic insects